Cameron Malveaux (born September 22, 1994) is a former American football defensive end. Malveaux signed with the Miami Dolphins as an undrafted free agent in 2017. He also played for the Arizona Cardinals, Cleveland Browns, and Philadelphia Eagles. He played college football at Houston.

High school
Malveaux attended Hamshire-Fannett High School in Texas and enrolled at the University of Houston in 2012.

College career
Malveaux played in 52 games and finished his career with 81 tackles, 17 for loss and 4 sacks. He was a 2016 team captain.

Professional career

Miami Dolphins
Malveaux signed with the Miami Dolphins as an undrafted free agent on May 5, 2017. He was waived on September 2, 2017 and was signed to the Dolphins' practice squad the next day. He was promoted to the active roster on December 2, 2017.

On September 1, 2018, Malveaux was waived by the Dolphins and was signed to the practice squad the next day. He was promoted to the active roster on October 2, 2018. He was waived on November 13, 2018 and re-signed to the practice squad.

Arizona Cardinals
On November 27, 2018, Malveaux was signed by the Arizona Cardinals off the Dolphins practice squad. He was released on August 31, 2019, during final roster cuts.

Kansas City Chiefs
Malveaux was signed to the Kansas City Chiefs practice squad on September 3, 2019. He was released on December 10, 2019.

Washington Redskins
The Washington Redskins signed Malveaux to their practice squad on December 17, 2019. He was signed to a reserve/future contract on December 30, 2019, but was waived on August 3, 2020.

San Francisco 49ers 
Malveaux was signed by the San Francisco 49ers on September 2, 2020, but was waived at the end of camp.

Cleveland Browns

Malveaux was signed to the Cleveland Browns' practice squad on October 10, 2020. He was elevated to the active roster on November 21 and November 28 for the team's weeks 11 and 12 games against the Philadelphia Eagles and Jacksonville Jaguars, and reverted to the practice squad after each game.

Malveaux was signed to the Browns' reserve/futures list on January 18, 2021. Malveaux was waived by the Browns on August 31, 2021.

Philadelphia Eagles
Malveaux was signed to the Philadelphia Eagles' practice squad on September 29, 2021. He signed a reserve/future contract with the Eagles on January 18, 2022. On April 21, 2022, Malveaux announced his retirement from the NFL.

References

External links
Houston Cougars bio

1994 births
Living people
Players of American football from Texas
Sportspeople from Beaumont, Texas
American football defensive ends
American football defensive tackles
Arizona Cardinals players
Houston Cougars football players
Kansas City Chiefs players
Miami Dolphins players
Philadelphia Eagles players
Washington Redskins players
Washington Football Team players
San Francisco 49ers players
Cleveland Browns players